Boris Ivanovich Shamanov (September 15, 1931 – March 1, 2008) was a Soviet Russian realist painter, graphic artist, and art teacher, People's Artist of the Russian Federation, who lived and worked in Saint Petersburg. He was a member of the Saint Petersburg Union of Artists (before 1992 named as the Leningrad branch of Union of Artists of Russian Federation), and regarded as one of the representatives of the Leningrad school of painting.

Biography 
Boris Ivanovich Shamanov was born September 15, 1931, in Leningrad, USSR.

In 1948, Boris Shamanov entered at the first course of the department of monumental painting of the Leningrad Higher School of Art and Industry. Boris Shamanov studied of Piotr Buchkin, Alexei Sokolov, Sergei Petrov, Kirill Iogansen.

In 1956 Boris Shamanov graduated in the Alexander Kazantsev workshop.

Since 1957 Boris Shamanov has participated in art exhibitions. He painted portraits, still lifes with flowers in exterior, genre scenes, and landscapes. Boris Shamanov worked in oils, tempera, and watercolors.

Boris Shamanov was a member of the Saint Petersburg Union of Artists from 1960.

Since 1960, Boris Shamanov combined his creative activities with pedagogical work at the painting department of the Leningrad Higher School of Art and Industry named after Vera Mukhina. In years of 1988-2008, he was a professor and head of painting department.

In 1984 Boris Shamanov was awarded the honorary title of Honored Artist of the RSFSR. In 1995 he was awarded the honorary title of People's Artist of the Russian Federation.

Boris Ivanovich Shamanov died on March 1, 2008, in Saint Petersburg. His paintings reside in State Russian Museum, State Treryakov Gallery, in art museums and private collections in Russia, France, England, US, China, Italy, Japan, and other countries.

See also 
 Leningrad School of Painting
 List of 20th-century Russian painters
 List of painters of Saint Petersburg Union of Artists
 Saint Petersburg Union of Artists

References

Bibliography 
 Matthew C. Bown. Dictionary of 20th Century Russian and Soviet Painters 1900-1980s. - London: Izomar, 1998. , .
 Time for change. The Art of 1960-1985 in the Soviet Union. - Saint Petersburg: State Russian Museum, 2006. - pp. 172–173.
 Sergei V. Ivanov. Unknown Socialist Realism. The Leningrad School. - Saint Petersburg: NP-Print Edition, 2007. – pp. 9, 19-21, 24, 27, 30, 31, 61, 302, 372, 390-402, 404-407, 415-424, 445. , .
 Логвинова Е. Круглый стол по ленинградскому искусству в галерее АРКА // Петербургские искусствоведческие тетради. Вып. 31. СПб, 2014. С.17-26.

1931 births
2008 deaths
20th-century Russian painters
Russian male painters
Soviet painters
Leningrad School artists
Socialist realist artists
People's Artists of Russia (visual arts)
Honored Artists of the Russian Federation
Members of the Leningrad Union of Artists
Saint Petersburg Stieglitz State Academy of Art and Design alumni
20th-century Russian male artists
21st-century Russian male artists